The Youth Protection Revision Act, commonly known as the Shutdown Law or Cinderella Law, was an act of the South Korean National Assembly which forbade children under the age of sixteen to play online video games between the hours of 00:00 and 06:00. The legislature passed the law on 19 May 2011 and it went into effect on 20 November 2011. The law was abolished in August 2021.

Overview 
Between the hours of 00:00 and 06:00, access to online games is blocked for all under the age of sixteen. The law has led those under sixteen to commit identity theft—underage South Koreans stole resident registration numbers in an effort to elude the law. The shutdown law targets online games, but does not affect console games and mobile games. However, due to its difficulty in performance of the law in some cases, they decided to entirely ban all games of some companies, such as Xbox Live or PSN. Legal challenges against the law were filed by a group of Korean game manufacturers and a cultural organization. After 2 September 2014, parents could request that their children be exempted from the law.

Constitutionality 
Internet game service providers filed a constitutional complaint about the shutdown law. They claimed that parts of the law infringed on the freedom of young people, the freedom of the game provider's occupation, the general freedom of action possessed by youths, and the rights of parents. The Constitutional Court of Korea rejected the complaint.

The court agreed that young people have the right to play video games but that the shutdown law did not infringe on their rights or liberty because video game addiction is detrimental to health. The court stated the rights of parents are not absolute and that the government can exercise control on families in dangerous situations. The court did not agree that the shutdown law unfairly targeted online game providers because online games are more addictive than other types of games.

History 

In October 2004, some civic groups called for the government to pass a shutdown law because teenagers needed their sleep. The advocacy groups organized a forum. Kim Jae Gyeong of the Grand National Party (Hannara) proposed the Juvenile Protection Act amendment in 2005. This amendment was an early version of the shutdown law. Game industry lobbyists and actions by the Ministry of Culture and Tourism killed the legislation. The next year, Kim Hi Jeong, of the Grand National Party (Hannara) proposed an "act on preventing and solving internet addiction, including online games". This bill would require games to warn players that the games are addictive and penalize players, especially teens, who play too long. This bill also failed for reasons similar to the 2005 defeat.

On 10 July 2008, Kim Jae Gyeong proposed the Juvenile Protection Act amendment which required online game providers to prohibit teens from playing their games between the hours of 00:00 and 06:00. The amendment set out penalties for game companies who did not comply—up to two years in jail and a fine of up to $10,000. One year later, Cho Yeong Hi, of the United Democratic Party proposed a similar amendment on 22 April 2009. It included the prohibition of online game service to young people from 00:00 to 06:00, required that parents approve the play of online games for teenagers, and required game providers to warn players about internet gaming addiction. The possible punishment for a violation was the same as in the previous proposed amendment.

The Ministry of Culture and Tourism and the Ministry of Gender Equality and Family were to introduce separate shutdown law amendments but decided to work together to develop one amendment that would be accepted by the legislature. They completed their version of the shutdown law bill on 3 June 2010. The shutdown law bill, which was included in the Juvenile Protection Act amendment, was introduced at the South Korea National Assembly plenary session and the bill was passed on 29 April 2011.

The shutdown law went into effect on 20 November 2011. It was applied to every online game in service in South Korea. Teenagers under seventeen years of age were not allowed to play online video games between the hours of 00:00 and 06:00. The law affected some online social games and every online game service that required a resident registration number.

On 24 April 2014, the constitutional court ruled that the shutdown law was constitutional.

As of August 2021 the law was abolished.

Similar laws in other countries

China 
In 2007, China introduced an Online Game Addiction Prevention System (Fatigue System). The fatigue system outlined a method to reduce the rewards in games (experience value and item drop rate) after a certain amount of time passed. This method was different than others that proposed forced termination after playing a game for a certain period of time. Once a player reached cumulative three to five hours of play, the game would reduce rewards by 50%. Once a player reached cumulative over five hours of play, the game would not give out any rewards. The fatigue system did not work well and was discarded.

According to the China Internet Network Information Center, the age of first-time Internet access for minors is steadily declining and the Internet usage rate for minors is consistently increasing. Additionally, most minors are using the Internet and 70% of offences committed by minors are caused by Internet. In 2016, China took steps to reduce the negative impact of the Internet on minors and passed the Minors Internet Protection Ordinance.

The ordinance includes restrictions on nighttime gaming and length of gaming sessions for minors, required online gaming service providers to change rules to reduce addiction, provided for education and guidance of minors, and required manufacturers to install software for the protection of minors.

Under 2019 rules, people under 18 were allowed to play games for 1 1/2 hours a day on most games. However, as of August 30, 2021, China's National Press and Publication Administration (General Administration of Press and Publication) published new rules, stating that people under 18 will be allowed to play video games one hour a day between 8 PM and 9 PM on Fridays, weekends, and legal holidays. The government announcements said all online video games will be required to connect to an "anti-addiction" system operated by the National Press and Publication Administration. Starting Wednesday, September 1, 2021, games will require all users to register using their real names and government-issued identification documents.

Vietnam 

In 2010, Ministry of Information and Communications (Vietnam) has cut off overnight public Internet access in businesses and banned advertisements of online games pending new regulations amid a public outcry over the games' influence on youth, the state-run news agency reported . The move also temporarily stopped the licensing of online games. Vietnamese officials announced the decision Tuesday and said it would remain in effect until the end of the year. Government officials said they hope to crack down on games with violent, gambling, and pornographic content and rate the games, according to Việt Nam News. 

In 2011, according to the Daily Mail (The UK Daily Mail is deemed as generally unreliable by Wikipedia however Time Magazine has used the Daily Mail as one of its sources for its article), the country is placing a ban on all online gaming activity from 10 PM to 8 AM in order to protect the youth from wasting their brains. “Provincial departments of information and communication will inspect online games activities nationwide and deal with organizations that violate regulations by canceling their services” Deputy Prime Minister of Vietnam Le Nam Thang said, adding that officials have tried other methods which have not proven effective. According to the article, internet service providers have until March 3 to comply with the shutoff or they will be cut off by the Vietnamese government. Gamasutra (now Game Developer) points out that China has put stringent restrictions on their country’s youth gamers including making games with “unwholesome” content including pornography, violence, gambling, cults, and material classified as “cruel” or “horrifying” illegal, outlawing real currency in games in lieu of virtual currency and put heavy restrictions on minors “buying” products in the gaming world.

References

Children's rights legislation
Law of South Korea
Video game law